Japanese football in 1927.

Emperor's Cup

National team

Results

Players statistics

Births
January 10 - Megumu Tamura

External links

 
Seasons in Japanese football